Skipsea Brough is a hamlet in the East Riding of Yorkshire, England.

It forms part of the civil parish of Skipsea.

Skipsea Brough is the location of Skipsea Castle which was built about 1086. The motte-and-bailey castle's buildings have since been destroyed, however, impressive earthworks still remain. In 2016 it was reported that the castle was itself built on top of a large Iron Age mound.

References

Villages in the East Riding of Yorkshire